Minorville is the fourth album by American Christian hip hop artist Derek Minor, released on September 10, 2013 through Reflection Music Group and Reach Records.

Reception

Critical reception
Andy Kellman from AllMusic gave the album a 3.5 out of 5 calling it "his most sonically rich and lyrically creative work yet". Michael Weaver from Jesus Freak Hideout gave the album a 4 out of 5, he said the album was a "slight step below" Minor's previous album Dying to Live but gave some positive feedback about the album for its messages saying " the record contains some important messages that are definitely powerful in nature".

Commercial performance
The album debuted at No. 40 on Billboard 200, No. 2 on Christian Albums and No. 6 on Rap Albums, with approximately 8,300 copies sold in its first week.  The album has sold 19,000 copies in the US as of January 2015.

Track listing

References 

Derek Minor albums
2013 albums
Reach Records albums
Albums produced by Gawvi